Alexandru Calamar (born 20 June 1941) is a Romanian ice hockey player. He competed in the men's tournaments at the 1964 Winter Olympics and the 1968 Winter Olympics.

References

1941 births
Living people
Olympic ice hockey players of Romania
Ice hockey players at the 1964 Winter Olympics
Ice hockey players at the 1968 Winter Olympics
Sportspeople from Miercurea Ciuc
Steaua Rangers players